Stihl is a German manufacturer of chainsaws and other handheld power equipment including trimmers and blowers. Their headquarters are in Waiblingen, Baden-Württemberg, near Stuttgart, Germany. Stihl was founded in 1926 by Andreas Stihl, an important innovator in early chain saw production. Stihl claims to be the world's best-selling brand of chain saws, and the only chain saw manufacturer to make its own saw chains and guide bars. Andreas Stihl AG is a privately held company owned by the descendants of Andreas Stihl. Stihl operates the Stihl Timbersports Series.

Company history 
Andreas Stihl designed and hand built his first chainsaw in 1926. Stihl grew slowly initially, as the chainsaws came to the market about the same time as the Great Depression; with manpower cheap, and old two-man saws proven, there was no need for power saws. In 1930, Stihl created the first ever chainsaw that could be operated by only one person. The company continued to grow and in 1931 it became the first European company to export chainsaws to the United States and the Soviet Union.

During the Second World War, the company operated in Bad Cannstatt as "A. Stihl Maschinenfabrik". After the factory was badly damaged in bombings in 1943-1944, it was moved to Neustadt (now Waiblingen). The company employed about 250 people in 1939, and during the war, it also employed a number of slave labourers. In 1945, Stihl, a Nazi Party and Allgemeine SS member, was arrested by Allied troops and his company was seized. After three years' detention, he was classified as a Mitläufer and released, and his company was returned.

Stihl has been the biggest chainsaw manufacturing company in the world since 1971. In the mid-1970s, Stihl expanded the company by building manufacturing plants in Brazil and in the United States. Much of the increased demand came from the construction and landscaping markets, although in Brazil it was mainly forest clearance. Along with the professional markets, Stihl designed a number of home-use equipment, like blowers, line trimmers, edgers, and chainsaws.

During the 1970s while building chainsaws, Stihl entered the weed-trimmer/brush-cutter market contracting a Japanese company as their supplier for several years until Stihl had their own model to build themselves.

In 1992, Stihl acquired Viking, an Austrian company.

In 2008, the newest Stihl production facility opened in Qingdao, China.
In December 2008, Stihl acquired the carburetor producer Zama to safeguard the supply and to enter a new business segment with growth potential.

Stihl Subsidiaries 

Incorporated in Delaware, Stihl Inc. is the US subsidiary of Stihl International GmbH and is based in Virginia Beach, Virginia.  Construction of the facilities there began in 1974. Along with the manufacturing facilities, there are also warehouses and administration buildings at the 150-acre complex. Stihl Inc. employs almost 2,000 employees on 2 million square feet of buildings.

Andreas Stihl Ltd was founded in 1978 in the United Kingdom.

Product gallery

Sponsorships

Air Racing
  National Championship Air Races (title sponsor, 2016-present)

Football
  NorthEast United (2019–Present)

References

External links
 

Manufacturing companies established in 1926
Companies based in Baden-Württemberg
Agricultural machinery manufacturers of Germany
Tool manufacturing companies of Germany
Lawn and garden tractors
Chainsaws
German brands
1926 establishments in Germany